Frederick Dennis (born 2 May 2003) is a Liberian professional footballer who plays as a midfielder for Liberian Second Division club FC Fassell and the Liberia national team.

References 

2003 births
Living people
Liberian footballers
Association football midfielders
Tony FC players
FC Fassell players
Liberia international footballers